Hockey Club Gdańsk and known as KH Gdańsk was a professional ice hockey team in Gdańsk, Poland. The team formerly played in the Polish 1. Liga, the second level of ice hockey in Poland.

History

The company that owned KH Gdańsk was set up on 6 May 2010, but did not organise a team until 2012. KH Gdańsk, the ice hockey team, were formed in March 2012 after agreeing to take over the debts of Stoczniowiec Gdańsk, who as a result of these financial difficulties had to dissolve after the 2011–12 season. The club played in the 2012–13 1. Liga, finishing 6th out of 7 clubs. At the end of the season the shares of KH Gdańsk were transferred to Stoczniowiec, leading to the reactivation of Stoczniowiec and the folding of KH Gdańsk.

Honours

1. Liga
6th place: 2012–13 (highest finish)

References

Ice hockey teams in Poland
Sport in Gdańsk
2012 establishments in Poland
Ice hockey clubs established in 2012
2013 disestablishments in Poland
Ice hockey clubs disestablished in 2013